James McGowan (10 June 1916 – 24 July 1989) was a Scottish footballer who played as a right back.

Career
McGowan played club football for Maryhill (Junior level) and Partick Thistle. He made a total of 543 appearances for Partick Thistle, including 243 in the Scottish Football League.

He made one official appearance for Scotland, a 2–2 draw with Belgium in January 1946. McGowan also played in a Victory International against Ireland in February 1946, which is not considered to be an official international, instead falling under the wartime fixtures.

His younger brother Ally McGowan was also a footballer, who played mainly for Wrexham.

Honours 
Club
Scottish League Cup: Runners up 1953–54
Glasgow Cup: 1950–51, 1952–53
Glasgow Charity Cup: 1948–49
Summer Cup: 1944–45

See also
List of one-club men in association football

References

1916 births
Footballers from Airdrie, North Lanarkshire
1989 deaths
Scottish footballers
Scotland international footballers
Scottish Junior Football Association players
Maryhill F.C. players
Partick Thistle F.C. players
Scottish Football League players
Association football fullbacks
Scotland wartime international footballers
Outfield association footballers who played in goal